Hymenogloea is a fungal genus in the family Marasmiaceae. The genus is monotypic, containing the single species Hymenogloea riofrioi, found in tropical America.

See also
 List of Marasmiaceae genera

References

 

Marasmiaceae
Monotypic Agaricales genera